Breton Communist Party (in French: Parti communiste Breton) was a separatist and Communist party in Brittany, France. The group was founded in 1971 by former members of the Unvaniezh Demokratel Breizh, and had the historian and critic of Breton collaboration with the German occupation, Kristian Hamon, as a notable member. It ceased to exist in 1980.

References

 Tudi Kernalegenn. Drapeaux rouges et gwenn-ha-du. L'extrême-gauche et la Bretagne dans les années 1970, Éditions Apogée (Rennes), 2005.

Political parties established in 1971
Breton nationalist parties
Communist parties in France
Maoist organizations in France
Political parties in Brittany
Separatism in France
Secessionist organizations in Europe
Far-left politics in France
Defunct Maoist parties
1971 establishments in France
Political parties disestablished in 1980
1980 disestablishments in France